El milagro de vivir is a Mexican telenovela produced by Ernesto Alonso for Televisión Independiente de México in 1975.

Cast 
Angélica María as Aura Velasco
Fernando Allende as Fred
Ana Martín as Jenny Gordon
Lilia Prado as Estela
Rita Macedo as María
Norma Herrera as Leonora
Lucy Gallardo as Lucia
Nubia Martí as Mili
Silvia Pasquel as Hortencia Alvarado
Raúl Ramírez as Carlos Alvarado
José Alonso as Hector Alvarado
Angélica Vale as baby Alejandra
Alberto Vazquez as Luis Alvarado
Mario Casillas as Alejandro Alvarado
Martha Patricia as Rita

References

External links 

Mexican telenovelas
1975 telenovelas
Televisa telenovelas
Spanish-language telenovelas
1975 Mexican television series debuts
1975 Mexican television series endings